Chytrium or Chytrion (Χυτριόν), or Chytrum or Chytron (Χυτρόν), also known as Chytum or Chyton (Χυτόν) was a town of ancient Ionia. Strabo tells us that it was here that the city of Clazomenae was initially founded.
 
Its site is located southwest of Urla, İzmir Province, Turkey.

References

Populated places in ancient Ionia
Former populated places in Turkey
History of İzmir Province